DramaTech Theatre is Georgia Tech's student-run theater. They are also home to Let's Try This! (the campus improv troupe).

History

Early history
Georgia Tech first had a dramatic organization as early as 1913, when a student troupe later known as the Marionettes formed. This group disbanded during World War II and in February 1947, a group of drama enthusiasts on campus met with Glenn James and formed the Georgia Tech Dramatic Club. Their first production, The Drunkard, directed by Jack Pompan, IM '48, was so successful that the English department accredited the fledgling organization enabling it to obtain financial aid from the university system. Members received academic credit from the English department for their involvement. With this impetus, Zenas Sears, a local Atlanta radio personality, became the first professional director of DramaTech and presented a series of one-act plays in the Tech YMCA auditorium in the spring of 1947.

For the next several years, DramaTech was a vagabond organization, presenting its plays in a variety of venues, including the YMCA and the Fowler Street School Auditorium. In 1952, with the assistance of architecture classes, DramaTech moved into a new home in the Crenshaw Field House, where it adopted a unique theatre in the round.

Unfortunately, this home was impermanent, and DramaTech was forced to move several times in the ensuing years. It occupied temporary stages in the Community Playhouse, an old church at Hemphill and Ferst, and later adjoined to the Robert Ferst Center for the Arts thanks to the work of Dean of Students Emeritus James Dull.

Recent history 
In the years before Georgia Tech became coeducational in 1952 and continuing until 1987, Agnes Scott College students and members of the community played women's roles and other roles that Georgia Tech students could not convincingly portray. Just as the Marionettes had in previous years, DramaTech produced critically acclaimed plays that were popular with the community, particularly during the long leadership of Atlanta actress Mary Nell Ivey Santacroce. Santacroce (1918-1999) directed nearly all of DramaTech's productions from 1949 until 1966. Other directors have included Sylvia Zsuffa (1947-1948), Zenas Sears (1948-1949), Gerard Appy (1952-1953), Charles J. Pecor (1967-1971), Dr. Fergus G. "Tad" Currie (1971-1973), Dana Ivey (1974-1977), Becky Dettra (1977-1980), David Califf (1980-1983), Scott Rousseau (1983-1984), and Greg Abbott (1984-2006).

In the early 90s, DramaTech created its own improv troupe, Let's Try This!, which is now 25 years old. The improv troupe began with the help of Robert Lowe and has continued to grow as a troupe, performing multiple times a semester and getting out into the Atlanta area.

In 1992, DramaTech finally acquired a permanent home with the dedication of the Dean James Dull Theatre at the back of the Robert Ferst Center for the Arts. Dean Emeritus Dull and his wife Gay, long-time supporters of DramaTech, established the Gay K. Dull Scholarship awarded to seniors who have been involved with the organization. Dean Dull died on March 22, 2009.

Greg Abbott, long-time artistic director of DramaTech died in December, 2006. Friends of DramaTech (FODT), the DramaTech alumni organization, offers the Gregory B. Abbott DramaTech Scholarship in his honor to current DramaTech students.

DramaTech Alumnus Tony Vila created a database with the list of all past shows, the cast and crew list, and other people who contributed to the shows.

Melissa Foulger is the current artistic director, having joined DramaTech in fall 2008.

References

External links 
DramaTech's website
DramaTech Theater Cast and Crew Database

Georgia Tech
Theatre in the United States